Margaretha Maria "Gretha" Tromp (born 21 February 1964) is a retired Dutch sprinter and hurdler. She competed at the 1988 Summer Olympics in the 100 m hurdles, 400 m hurdles and 4×100 metres relay, but failed to reach the final in any event. She won two medals at the 1991 Summer Universiade.

References

External links
 

1964 births
Living people
Dutch female hurdlers
Dutch female sprinters
Athletes (track and field) at the 1988 Summer Olympics
Olympic athletes of the Netherlands
People from Heerhugowaard
World Athletics Championships athletes for the Netherlands
Universiade medalists in athletics (track and field)
Universiade gold medalists for the Netherlands
Universiade silver medalists for the Netherlands
Medalists at the 1991 Summer Universiade
Sportspeople from North Holland
20th-century Dutch women